Teleiopsis is a genus of moths of the family Gelechiidae.

Range
Teleiopsis have a Holarctic distribution, with one exception. The centre of evolution is found in the area surrounding the Mediterranean.

Species
 Teleiopsis albifemorella (E. Hofmann, 1867)
 Teleiopsis bagriotella (Duponchel, 1840)
 Teleiopsis baldiana (Barnes & Busck, 1920)
 Teleiopsis brevivalva Pitkin, 1988
 Teleiopsis diffinis (Haworth, 1828)
 Teleiopsis insignita Pitkin, 1988
 Teleiopsis latisacculus Pitkin, 1988
 Teleiopsis lunariella (Walsingham, 1908)
 Teleiopsis motleella Ponomarenko & Park, 2007
 Teleiopsis paulheberti Huemer & Mutanen, 2012
 Teleiopsis rosalbella (Fologne, 1862)
 Teleiopsis sophistica (Meyrick, 1935)
 Teleiopsis terebinthinella (Herrich-Schäffer, 1856)
 Teleiopsis tchukotka Bidzilya, 2012

References

 Teleiopsis at Fauna Europaea
 Revised Checklist of Gelechiidae in America north of Mexico

 
Litini
Moth genera